Shaun P. Kelly (born March 13, 1964 in Pittsfield, Massachusetts) is an American politician who represented the 2nd Berkshire District in the Massachusetts House of Representatives from the year 1991–2005.

References

1964 births
Republican Party members of the Massachusetts House of Representatives
People from Pittsfield, Massachusetts
Boston College alumni
Living people
People from Dalton, Massachusetts